Kevin Miles Murphy (born 1958) is the George J. Stigler Distinguished Service Professor of Economics at the University of Chicago Booth School of Business and a Senior Fellow at the Hoover Institution.

In 1997 Murphy was awarded the prestigious John Bates Clark Medal by the American Economic Association, given once every two years to the most outstanding American economist under the age of forty, and widely considered to be the second most prestigious prize in economics (after the Nobel Prize in Economics).  Murphy was cited for his study of the causes of growing income inequality between white-collar and blue-collar workers in the United States and his research linking the growth in income inequality to growth in the demand for skilled labor. His other research has covered such topics as economic growth, income inequality, valuing medical research, rational addiction, and unemployment.

Murphy has authored over 50 published articles on a variety of topics including a cost–benefit analysis of the war in Iraq.

On September 20, 2005, he was named as one of the 2005 recipients of the MacArthur Fellowship, often referred to as the "genius grant."

Education: B.A. (economics, Phi Beta Kappa), University of California, Los Angeles, 1981; PhD, University of Chicago, 1986 (thesis: Specialization and Human Capital).

Major works
 Measuring the Gains from Medical Research: An Economic Approach (edited volume with Robert H. Topel) University of Chicago Press, 2003.
 Social Economics: Market Behavior in a Social Environment (with Gary S. Becker). Cambridge, MA : Harvard University Press (The Belknap Press), 2000.

References

External links
 University of Chicago press release announcing John Bates Clark Medal
 Selected bibliography of articles by Kevin M. Murphy
 
 MacArthur Fellowship biography page
 Profile in The University of Chicago Magazine, Nov 2006

Labor economists
20th-century American economists
21st-century American economists
MacArthur Fellows
Fellows of the Econometric Society
Living people
University of California, Los Angeles alumni
University of Chicago alumni
University of Chicago faculty
1958 births
Member of the Mont Pelerin Society